Nakawan Range is the longest continuous limestone hill in Malaysia. The range is part of the Setul Formation and runs along Perlis' half of the Malaysia-Thailand Border for approximately 36 km. Part of the range is gazetted as Perlis State Park.

Titiwangsa Mountains